Doorways to Space is a collection of science fiction short stories by Basil Wells.  It was published in 1951 by Fantasy Publishing Company, Inc. in an edition of 700 copies.  The stories were original to this collection.

Contents
 "The Lurkers of Burm"
 "The Singer"
 "Barren World"
 "Planet of the Mist"
 "Lord of the Desert Planet"
 "Rebellion on Venus"
 "The Aliens"
 "Space Woman"
 "The Sudden Forest"
 "The Elfin Hills"
 "Conquest"
 "Martyr from Mars"
 "Chrysalid"
 "Exiles of the Forbidden Planet"
 "The Chair"

References

1951 short story collections
Science fiction short story collections
Fantasy Publishing Company, Inc. books